The City of Orange is a local government area in the central west region of New South Wales, Australia. Based in Orange, the area is located adjacent to the Mitchell Highway and the Main Western railway line.

Suburbs and localities
Suburbs of Orange:

Other localities:

Heritage listings
The City of Orange has a number of heritage-listed sites, including:
 4570-4578 Mitchell Highway, : Wentworth and Reform Gold Mines
 219-255 Anson Street, Orange: Uniting Church and Kindergarten Hall
 3-25 Bathurst Road, Orange: Bowen Terrace
 84 Byng Street, Orange: Union Bank of Australia building
 Forest Road, Orange: Bloomfield Hospital
 Peisley Street, Orange: Orange railway station
 24-26 Summer Street, Orange: Cook Park
 29 Summer Street, Orange: Berrilea
 221 Summer Street, Orange: Orange Post Office
 Woodward Street, Orange: Duntryleague

Council history
Situated on Blackman's Swamp Creek, Orange was proclaimed a village in 1846 and the local parish was named by the Surveyor General, Major Sir Thomas Mitchell, in honour of Prince William of Orange, whom had been an associate of in the Peninsular War, when both were aides-de-camp to the Duke of Wellington, whose title was bestowed on the valley to the west by John Oxley. Much of the town's subsequent growth and development in the early years was due to the discovery of gold in 1851 at Ophir and Lucknow. The resulting gold rush attracted a wide range of people and business to the district, many of whom settled in the region and developed a strong agricultural industry, particularly in the growing of wheat and barley.

Orange was first incorporated on 9 January 1860 when the Municipality of Orange was proclaimed. The first election for a six-member council was held on 9 February 1860, with John Peisley elected as the first Chairman. The first meeting of the Council was held at the Court House on 18 February 1860, with George Dolquhorn appointed as the first Town Clerk.

This new council fell into controversy within a few years however, with the legality of the council constitution questioned in 1866 and the council suspended by order of the Supreme Court of New South Wales. With the Municipalities Act 1867, the Council was reconstituted and a new council was elected on 14 February 1868. In 1888, the Municipality of East Orange was proclaimed and merged with the Orange Municipality on 24 December 1912.

Orange was proclaimed a City on 19 July 1946 when its population was over 15,000. On 1 October 1977, the City of Orange was extended in area to 298 km2 when parts of the surrounding shires of Cabonne, Blayney, and Lyndhurst were transferred to the City of Orange.

2016–17 amalgamation proposal
Despite originally planning for the amalgamation to go ahead, the merger scheduled for May 2016 was delayed due to legal action, and in February 2017 the NSW Government decided not to proceed with the amalgamation.

Council

Current composition and election method
Orange City Council is composed of eleven Councillors elected proportionally as a single ward. All Councillors are elected for a fixed four-year term of office. The Mayor is elected directly by a popular vote. A referendum was held on 8 September 2012 and an absolute majority of voters resolved in favour to directly-elect the Mayor, which took effect from the 2017 election. The most recent election was held on 9 September 2017, but due to delays caused by council amalgamations the current term will last only three years to 2020. The makeup of the Council is as follows:

The current Council, elected in 2021, is:

References

External links
Orange City Council

Orange
1860 establishments in Australia